Swami Dayananda Saraswati (15 August 1930 – 23 September 2015) was a renunciate of the Hindu order of sannyasa, a renowned traditional teacher of Advaita Vedanta, and founder of the Arsha Vidya Gurukulam and AIM For Seva.

Biography

In July 1982, Swami Dayananda decided to leave Chinmaya Mission. He felt a strong incompatibility between his growing role in, essentially, management of a multinational spiritual organization, and his desires to live a simpler spiritual life as an itinerant monk. The split had been a long time in the making, having been a topic of discussion between Swami Dayananda and Swami Chinmayananda for some time.

The timing of Swami Dayananda's departure created problems for the Mission. He had just graduated nearly 60 Vedanta teachers from Sandeepany West two weeks before his departure, nearly all of whom left Chinmaya Mission to follow Swami Dayananda once he left. Swami Dayananda's departure, wrote a journalist in October 1983, Hinduism Today, "created a tidal wave of shock that washed across the international Chinmaya Mission shores, and has only recently weakened enough to not be an emotion-charged topic of the international Mission's monthly magazine's letters to the editor." In an interview shortly after his departure, Swami Dayananda did not comment on Chinmaya Mission but emphasized that he was "a simple teacher spreading the universal truths of Vedantic self-knowledge."

The most well-known student of Swami Dayananda Saraswati is Narendra Modi, prime minister of India.

Other activities

All India Movement for Seva

In 2000, All India Movement for Seva (AIM for Seva) an NGO focused on making education and healthcare available to children in rural areas of India.

Acharya Sabha
In 2003, Dayananda Saraswati brought various monks and matathipatis across India under one umbrella called Hindu Dharma Acharya Sabha, otherwise known as HDAS or simply Acharya Sabha.

By its fourth congregation in 2010, the Sabha had as many as 100 Dharmacharyas from various traditions participating. 

As of 2021, the Sabha remains active and continues to seek protections for Sanatana Dharma and places of worship. Presently the chairman of Acharya Sabha is Swami Avdheshanand Giri Ji Maharaj, Acharya Mahamandleshwar of Juna Akhara

Others
In 1999, Swami Dayananda founded the Dharma Rakshana Samiti.

In 2003, Swami Dayananda established the Swami Dayananda Educational Trust (SDET).  The educational trust manages the Swami Dayananda College of Arts & Science of Manjakkudi which was established in 2001. It is affiliated with Bharathidasan University.

Litigation
In 2012, Swami Dayananda filed Writ Petition 476 challenging the Constitutional validity of various provisions of the Hindu Religious Endowments and Institutions Acts in the two states of Tamil Nadu and Andhra Pradesh, and the city of Pondicherry. The case was deferred to the Supreme Court of India, and an outcome remains to be seen as of 2019.

Subramanian Swamy was impleaded in the case for the Podu Dīkṣitars of the Chidambaram Temple. When the matter was dismissed at the Madras High Court in 2009, Dr. Subramanian and the represented appealed to the final court. About 5 years later, on 6 January in 2014, the high court's ruling was overturned at the Supreme Court of India, which resulted in the release of government control over the affairs of the temple.

Subramanian is also litigating the defense and protection of Ram Sethu at the behest of Swami Dayananda, who on 20 April 2008 organized for the release of Subramanian's book, Ram Setu: a Symbol of National Unity. In 2020, the Supreme Court of India motioned to consider designating the so-called Adam's Bridge as a national heritage site. In 2021, a former vice chancellor from Alagappa University motioned to the court that the Ram Sethu does not meet the requirements of an ancient monument under the law, and the top court has no power to declare it a national monument, on the basis of the claim that the Adam's Bridge is not a permanent structure, and that its geological features are subject to change.

See also
 Swami Sivananda

References

20th-century Hindu religious leaders
21st-century Hindu religious leaders
1930 births
2015 deaths
Advaitin philosophers
Indian founders
Indian male writers
Indian Hindu monks
Indian religious writers
Indian spiritual teachers
Indian spiritual writers
Indian Hindu saints
People from Thiruvarur
Recipients of the Padma Bhushan in other fields
Translators of the Bhagavad Gita